Trypophobia is an aversion to the sight of irregular patterns or clusters of small holes or bumps. It is not officially recognized as a mental disorder, but may be diagnosed as a specific phobia if excessive fear and distress occur. Most affected people experience mainly disgust when they see trypophobic imagery.  A minority of people experience the same level of fear and disgust, and a few express only disgust or fear.

The scientific understanding of trypophobia is limited. Although few studies have been done on trypophobia, researchers hypothesize that it is the result of a biological revulsion that associates trypophobic shapes with danger or disease, and may therefore have an evolutionary basis. Exposure therapy is a possible treatment.

The term trypophobia was coined by a participant in an online forum in 2005. It has since become a popular topic on social media.

Classification
Trypophobia is not recognized by name as a mental disorder, and so is not a specific diagnosis in the American Psychiatric Association's Diagnostic and Statistical Manual, Fifth Edition (DSM-5). However, it may fall under the broad category of specific phobia if it involves fear that is excessive, persistent, and associated with significant distress or impairment.

Whether trypophobia can be accurately described as a specific phobia might depend on whether the person mainly responds with fear or with disgust. Because phobias involve fear, a response to trypophobic imagery that is based mostly or solely on disgust renders its status as a specific phobia questionable. In one study, most of the participants with trypophobia met the DSM-5 criteria for a specific phobia, even though they experienced disgust instead of fear when shown imagery of clusters of holes; however, they did not meet the distress or impairment criterion.

Signs and symptoms
Trypophobia often presents with an autonomic nervous system response. Shapes that elicit a trypophobic reaction include clustered holes in innocuous contexts, such as fruit and bubbles, and in contexts associated with danger, such as holes made by insects and holes in wounds and diseased tissue such as those caused by mango flies in animals, especially dogs. Upon seeing these shapes, some people said they shuddered, felt their skin crawl, experienced panic attacks, sweated, palpitated, or felt nauseated or itchy.  Other reported symptoms include goose bumps, body shakes, feeling uncomfortable, and visual discomfort such as eyestrain, distortions, or illusions.

Trypophobia may manifest as a reaction of fear, disgust, or both. Disgust is usually the stronger emotion in those with trypophobia.

Causes
The understanding of trypophobia is limited. Several possible causes have been proposed. Geoff Cole and Arnold Wilkins believe the reaction is an "unconscious reflex reaction" based on a biological revulsion, rather than a learned cultural fear. Imagery of various venomous animals (for example, certain types of snakes, insects, and spiders) have visual characteristics similar to trypophobic imagery. Furthermore, other animals such as the frog Pipa pipa have been known to be a trypophobia trigger. Because of this, it is hypothesized that trypophobia has an evolutionary basis meant to alert humans of dangerous organisms. Can et al., however, believe the connection between trypophobia and evolution as a result of a threat from deadly creatures to be weak and that, if a connection does exist, it manifests later in life rather than in childhood.

Martínez-Aguayo et al. described trypophobia as usually involving "an intense and disproportionate fear towards holes, repetitive patterns, protrusions, etc., and, in general, images that present high-contrast energy at low and midrange spatial frequencies." Cole and Wilkins also stated the imagery has high spatial frequency with greater energy at midrange. Whether together or separate, it appears that low and midrange spatial frequencies are necessary for inducing trypophobic reactions. Based on the imagery's visual cues, An Trong Dinh Le, Cole, and Wilkins developed a symptom questionnaire that they believe can be used to identify trypophobia.

Researchers have also speculated that trypophobic reactions could be perceived as cues to infectious disease, which could be alerts that give one a survival advantage. In a study by Kupfer and Le, trypophobic and non-trypophobic participants showed significant aversion to disease-relevant cluster images, but only trypophobic participants displayed a significant aversion to disease-irrelevant cluster images. Martínez-Aguayo et al. stated that, because the reactions could not be attributed to different sensitivity levels or neuroticism differences, Kupfer and Le believe it supports their hypothesis that trypophobia is "an overgeneralized aversion towards cluster stimuli that indicates a parasitic and infectious disease threat". Yamada and Sasaki also propose that trypophobic reactions are due to the imagery's visual similarities to skin diseases.  

Whether trypophobia is associated with obsessive–compulsive disorder (OCD) has also been studied. A significant minority of those with trypophobia meet the DSM-5 criteria for an obsessive-compulsive disorder. Martínez-Aguayo et al. stated that other findings refer to trypophobia having common comorbid psychiatric diagnosis, such as major depressive disorder or generalized anxiety disorder, although Le et al. felt that general anxiety does not cause trypophobia.

Treatment
There are no known treatments for trypophobia, but exposure therapy, which has been used to treat phobias, is likely to be an effective treatment.

Epidemiology
The extent to which trypophobia exists is unknown, but the available data suggests that having an aversion to trypophobic imagery is relatively common. 16% of a sample of 286 participants in a 2013 study reported discomfort or repulsion when presented with an image of a lotus seed pod and its authors found that non-trypophobic individuals also experienced more discomfort when viewing trypophobic imagery than when viewing neutral images. Trypophobia appears to be more prevalent in women.

Etymology 

Society and culture
Groups on social media sites such as Facebook and Instagram exist for self-identified trypophobics to share and discuss images that they say induce the reaction.

Because trypophobia is not well known to the general public, many people with the condition do not know the name for it and believe that they are alone in their trypophobic reactions and thoughts until they find an online community to share them with. This has led to an increase in trypophobic images on social media; in some cases, people seek to intentionally induce trypophobia in those who have it by showing them trypophobic images, with the most trypophobic-inducing images being holes and clusters (especially the lotus seedhead) photoshopped onto human skin. Cole and Wilkins also stated that the level of disgust with trypophobia increases if the holes are on human skin. Writing in Popular Science, Jennifer Abbasi argues that emotional contagion within such social media groups may be responsible for some of the aversive reactions to such images.

In 2017, trypophobia received media attention when American Horror Story featured a trypophobic character and trypophobia-inducing advertisements promoting the storyline; some people were disturbed by the imagery, and criticized the show for "insensitivity towards sufferers of trypophobia". Although there was sentiment that the increased media attention could lead to people trying to induce trypophobia, there were also opinions that it might help people understand trypophobia and encourage more research on the matter. Some users responded to the September 2019 release of Apple's iPhone 11 Pro, which features three closely spaced camera lenses, with comments that it triggered their trypophobia.

Writer and editor Kathleen McAuliffe suggested that trypophobia is yet to be extensively studied because researchers have not given as much attention to topics of disgust as they have to other areas of research, and because of the revulsion viewing the images could incite in researchers.

See also
 List of phobias
 Ommetaphobia

References

External links 
 

2000s neologisms
Holes
Phobias